This is a discography for American folk singer and songwriter Joan Baez.

Studio albums

1959
"Folksingers 'Round Harvard Square" 1959 - with Bill Wood and Ted Alevizos

1960s

1970s

1980–present

Live albums

Soundtrack albums
 Sacco & Vanzetti, RCA Victor (1971)
 Carry It On, Vanguard (1971)
 Silent Running, Decca (1972)
 How Sweet the Sound, Razor & Tie (2009)

Compilations
 Folksingers 'Round Harvard Square (1959) / Re-Released as The Best of Joan Baez, Squire (1963)#45 POP
 Portrait of Joan Baez (1967) (UK Only)
 Joan Baez On Vanguard (1969) (UK Only) #15 UK
 The First 10 Years, Vanguard (November 1970) #73 POP #41 UK #37 CAN
 The Joan Baez Ballad Book, Vanguard (1972) #188 POP
 Hits: Greatest and Others, Vanguard (1973) #163 POP, #63 Australia
 The Contemporary Ballad Book, Vanguard (1974)
 The Joan Baez Lovesong Album, Vanguard (1976) #205 POP
 Best of Joan C. Baez, A&M (1977) #121 POP
 The Joan Baez Country Music Album (1979)
 Very Early Joan, Vanguard (1982)
 Joan Baez: Classics, A&M (1986)
 Brothers in Arms, Gold Castle (1991)
 No Woman No Cry, Laserlight (February 1992)
 Rare, Live & Classic (box set), Vanguard (1993)
 The Best of Joan Baez, Vanguard (1995)
 Greatest Hits, A&M (1996)
 Vanguard Sessions: Baez Sings Dylan, Vanguard (1998)
 Imagine, Universal 1998
 Best of Joan Baez: The Millennium Collection, A&M/Universal (1999)
 The Complete A&M Recordings, Universal/A&M (2003)
 Vanguard Visionaries: Joan Baez, Vanguard (2007)
 The Complete Gold Castle Masters (box set), Razor & Tie (2017)

Singles

EPs
 Silver Dagger & Other Songs, Fontana (1961) UK
 With God on Our Side, Fontana (1963) UK
 Don't Think Twice, It's All Right, Fontana (1963) UK
 Luv Is the Foundation w/ Rocker-T (2009) US

Video albums
 In Concert, Pioneer (VHS, Laserdisc 1990)
 Live at Sing Sing, NY 1972 (w/ B.B. King),  (DVD 2004)
 Three Voices: Live in Concert (1988 concert w/ Konstantin Wecker & Mercedes Sosa), (DVD 2004)
 How Sweet the Sound, American Masters/Razor & Tie (DVD 2009)
 Golden Hits: Live Collection, Blueline (DVD 2013)
 Oh Freedom: Live in London, Hudson Street (DVD 2014)
 75th Birthday Celebration, Razor & Tie (DVD 2016)

Contributions
 Hard Rain by Bob Dylan (1976) - guitar, background vocals
 4 Songs From Renaldo and Clara EP by Bob Dylan (1978) - vocals on "Never Let Me Go"
 The Butterfly Tree by Julia Butterfly Hill, Joan Baez, Joy Carlin, Berkeley Symphony Orchestra & Kent Nagano (2002) - vocals
 The Bootleg Series Vol. 5: Bob Dylan Live 1975, The Rolling Thunder Revue (2002) - vocals, acoustic guitar & percussion on 4 songs
 The Bootleg Series Vol. 6: Bob Dylan Live 1964, Concert at Philharmonic Hall (2004) - vocals on 4 songs
 Corazón libre by Mercedes Sosa (2005) - cover art
 Born to the Breed: A Tribute to Judy Collins (2008) - "Since You've Asked"
 Journey to the New World by Sharon Isbin, Joan Baez & Mark O'Connor (2009) - "Joan Baez Suite Op. 144" & "Go 'Way from My Window"
 Tune In, Turn Up, Sing Out by San Francisco Gay Men's Chorus (2009) - "Swingin with the Saints" & "Imagine"
 Bob Dylan – The Rolling Thunder Revue: The 1975 Live Recordings (2019) - vocals, acoustic guitar & percussion on 12 songs
 Als teus ulls by Mario Muñoz feat. Lluís Llach, Gemma Humet & Joan Baez (2019) - single

References

External links
 

Discographies of American artists
Folk music discographies